Jean-Denis Delétraz (born 1 October 1963) is a Swiss racing driver. He participated in three Formula One Grands Prix, debuting in the 1994 Australian Grand Prix. Before reaching Formula One, he scored two third places in the 1988 Formula 3000 season, but principally earned his three Formula One drives as a pay driver. After Formula One, he competed in sports car racing, with two class wins at the 24 Hours of Le Mans.

Career

Pre-Formula One
Delétraz had some success in his early career, including two wins in Formula Ford cars. He went on to compete in Formula Three between 1985 and 1987 in the French championship, finishing 14th in the final standings in 1987. Between 1988 and 1991, he competed in Formula 3000 and during 1990 he bought the FIRST racing team, but was never able to match the success of 1988 and scored no points. During 1991 the team was impounded by an Italian court for a time after legal action from the team's other driver, Giovanni Bonanno.

In 1992 and 1993, Deletraz competed in the French Touring Car Championship and the Porsche Supercup with little success. In 1994, Delétraz was signed as a driver for the SEAT works team in the French Touring Car Championship. His best result was fifth place in the race at Nogaro and he finished thirteenth overall in the standings.

Formula One

1994: Larrousse
Towards the end of 1994, Larrousse was, like a number of other teams at the time, running short of money and needed pay drivers to keep the team afloat. Larrousse's number 19 car, which had started the year being driven by Olivier Beretta, was now being driven by drivers who could bring sponsorship money to the team. For the final race of the year in Australia, Larrousse let the aero-car inexperienced, physically unfit Delétraz replace Érik Comas in the team's second car for more sponsorship money in order to aid their financial situation.

During qualifying, Delétraz qualified in 25th position, ahead of Simtek's Domenico Schiattarella. However, Schiattarella overtook him during the first lap of the Grand Prix, and Delétraz gradually dropped back from the rest of the field. He retired on lap 57 with gearbox failure, after he had already been lapped ten times. He was lapping the circuit six seconds slower than the leaders, two seconds slower than his teammate Hideki Noda and 1–2 seconds slower than the next slowest driver Schiattarella. He was described by BBC commentator Jonathan Palmer as "having no business in Formula One."

1995: Pacific
Pacific Team Lotus started with shareholder Bertrand Gachot and Andrea Montermini as its drivers, but similar to Larrousse the previous year, the team needed pay drivers to continue the season and Gachot vacated his seat. It was announced that Delétraz would be competing in the final five races of the season.

During qualifying for his first round of the year, in Portugal, Delétraz was hindered by a gearbox problem which saw him qualify last, twelve seconds behind pole-position sitter David Coulthard. In the race, Delétraz was 40 seconds behind Coulthard after 3 laps, and was lapping the circuit 12 seconds slower than the leaders and 6–7 seconds than the next slowest driver Roberto Moreno in a Forti and 7–8 seconds slower than his team-mate Montermini. He was lapped by the leaders after seven laps of the race, and after fourteen he retired from the race with cramp in his left arm. This drew criticism as Estoril is a clockwise circuit, which requires more work from the right arm. In his second race at the Nürburgring, he qualified just over nine seconds behind pole-position, and he finished the race in fifteenth place as the last finisher, seven laps behind the winner.  At one point while he was being lapped by the leaders, Delétraz suddenly darted his car across the track from one side to the other and back again, prompting BBC commentator Murray Walker to exclaim "And what is Delétraz doing? Doesn't matter what he's doing."

At the next race, he was replaced by Bertrand Gachot after planned replacements were denied superlicenses. It had been expected that Delétraz would be competing until the end of the season, but he defaulted on payment and Keith Wiggins, principal of the Pacific team stated, "On ability alone, we are not willing to keep him."

The slow qualifying speeds of drivers like Delétraz  resulted in the introduction of the 107% rule for the 1996 season - with some F1 fans nicknaming the new regulation the "Delétraz rule" as a result.

Sports Car Racing

After his tenure in Formula One, Delétraz focused on endurance racing, running in the 24 Hours of LeMans and the BPR Global GT Series in 1995. 1996 saw Delétraz move to the FIRST Racing operation he now co-owned with fellow driver Fabien Giroix. Two years in the BPR Global GT Series in a McLaren F1 GTR was followed by a move to the FIA GT Championship in 1997, with FIRST running the works Lotus Elise GT1s. After a couple of years away, FIRST and Delétraz returned to the FIA Championship in 2000 with a Ferrari 550 Maranello. In 2002, he took four wins in the series with team-mate Andrea Piccini in a BMS Scuderia Italia-run 550, and the pair finished fifth in the championship. They then drove a works Lister Storm in 2003. He has also scored two class wins at the 24 Hours of Le Mans, in 2001 and 2002 in the LMP675 class. He was also one of the drivers of the Chevrolet Corvette C6.R that won the 2007 Spa 24 Hours.

Jean-Denis's son, Louis, is also a racing driver with experience in Formula 2, endurance, and sports car racing.

Racing record

Complete International Formula 3000 results
(key) (Races in bold indicate pole position) (Races 
in italics indicate fastest lap)

Complete World Sportscar Championship results
(key) (Races in bold indicate pole position) (Races in italics indicate fastest lap)

Complete Formula One results
(key)

24 Hours of Le Mans results

Complete FIA GT Championship results
(key) (Races in bold indicate pole position) (Races in italics indicate fastest lap)

Complete FIA World Endurance Championship results
(key) (Races in bold indicate pole position; races in italics indicate fastest lap)

Footnotes

1963 births
Swiss racing drivers
Swiss Formula One drivers
Larrousse Formula One drivers
Pacific Formula One drivers
French Formula Three Championship drivers
British Formula Three Championship drivers
Living people
FIA GT Championship drivers
Sportspeople from Geneva
International Formula 3000 drivers
24 Hours of Le Mans drivers
American Le Mans Series drivers
European Le Mans Series drivers
World Sportscar Championship drivers
FIA World Endurance Championship drivers
24 Hours of Spa drivers
World Touring Car Championship drivers
DAMS drivers
Phoenix Racing drivers
KTR drivers
W Racing Team drivers
Le Mans Cup drivers